Hoist may refer to:

 Hoist (device), a machine for lifting loads
 Hoist controller, a machine for raising and lowering goods or personnel by means of a cable
 Hydraulic hooklift hoist, another machine
 Hoist (mining), another machine
 Hoist (flag), the half of a flag nearer to the flagpole
 Hoist (album), by Phish
 USS Hoist (ARS-40), a Bolster class rescue and salvage ship acquired by the U.S. Navy during World War II
 Hoist (motion), a parliamentary procedure used in Canadian legislative bodies
 Patient lift, for lifting people
 Outliner, filter for viewing

Computing
In computing, hoisting may refer to:
 Loop-invariant code motion, a compiler optimization
 Variable hoisting, scope rule in JavaScript

See also